Ksawery Branicki or Xavier Branicki could refer to:

 Count Xavier Branicki or Franciszek Ksawery Branicki (1816-1879), Polish nobleman
 Ksawery Branicki (1864–1926), Polish nobleman and naturalist
 Franciszek Ksawery Branicki (1730–1819), Polish nobleman